Kikuni is a rural locality (a selo) in Kukuninsky Selsoviet, Gergebilsky District, Republic of Dagestan, Russia. The population was 3,224 as of 2010. There are 36 streets.

Geography 
Kikuni is located 3 km northwest of Gergebil (the district's administrative centre) by road. Gergebil and Kurmi are the nearest rural localities.

References 

Rural localities in Gergebilsky District